Normandin may refer to:

People
Adam Normandin, U.S. contemporary realist painter
Alphonse Normandin, an early settler of Abitibi-Temiscaminque; namesake of the Pont Alphonse-Normandin
Christine Normandin (born 1984), Canadian politician
Daniel Normandin, a gold medalist at the 2005 Canadian Paralympic Athletics Championships
Jacques-Antoine Normandin (born 1951), Canadian politician
Joseph-Laurent Normandin (19th century), Canadian surveyor, namesake of Normandin, Quebec
Luis Normandín (born 1932), Argentine water polo player who competed in the 1952 Summer Olympics
Zak Normandin (born 1984), American entrepreneur and the current CEO and co-founder of the NYC-based beverage company, Dirty Lemon Beverages

Places 
 Normandin, Quebec, Canada; a city in Maria-Chapdelaine, Saguenay-Lac-Saint-Jean
 Normandin River, a tributary of the north shore of Ashuapmushuan Lake, Lac-Ashuapmushuan, Le Domaine-du-Roy, Saguenay-Lac-Saint-Jean, Quebec, Canada
 Normandin Lake (Normandin River), Lac-Ashuapmushuan, Le Domaine-du-Roy, Saguenay-Lac-Saint-Jean, Quebec, Canada; a lake

Facilities and structures
Pont Alphonse-Normandin, a covered bridge over the Davy River, in Abitibi-Temiscamingue, Quebec, Canada
Normandin Middle School, New Bedford, Massachusetts, USA

Other uses
Joly-Normandin, a motion picture film format

See also

 
 Normandy (disambiguation)
 Normandie (disambiguation)
 Norman (disambiguation)